D Frosted is the second live album released by the hard rock band Gotthard. It was released on 29 September 1997 by BMG.

Track listing

Personnel
Gotthard
Steve Lee – vocals
Leo Leoni – guitars and backing vocals
Marc Lynn – bass and backing vocals
Hena Habegger – drums

Additional musicians
Mandy Meyer – guitars
Vic Vergeat – guitars and backing vocals
Andy Pupato – percussion
HP Brüggemann – keyboards

Production
Chris von Rohr – producer
Thomas Brück – engineer
Eric Merz – mixing

External links
Heavy Harmonies page

1997 live albums
Gotthard (band) albums